Suite in E minor, BWV 996, is a musical composition written by Johann Sebastian Bach (16851750) between 1708 and 1717. It is probable that this suite was intended for Lautenwerck (lute-harpsichord). Because the lautenwerk is an uncommon instrument, it is in modern times often performed on the guitar or the lute.

Musical structure 

The work consists of six movements:
Präludium: Presto
Allemande
Courante
(Sarabande)
Bourrée
(Gigue)

Instrumentation
Bach wrote his lute pieces in a traditional score rather than in lute tablature, and some believe that Bach played his lute pieces on the keyboard. No original script of the Suite in E minor for Lute by Bach is known to exist. However, in the collection of one of Bach's pupils, Johann Ludwig Krebs, there is one piece ("Praeludio – con la Suite da Gio: Bast. Bach") that has written "aufs Lauten Werck" ("for the lute-harpsichord") in unidentified handwriting.

Some argue that despite the annotation about the lute-harpsichord, the piece was meant to be played on the lute as demonstrated by the texture. Others argue that since the piece was written in E minor, it would be incompatible with the baroque lute which was tuned to D minor unless a capo was on the 2nd fret. Nevertheless, it may be played with other string instruments, such as the guitar, mandola or mandocello, and keyboard instruments (Such as Piano), and the fifth movement (the bourrée) is especially well-known among guitarists.

See also 
 Bourrée in E minor, other uses of the fifth movement bourrée from this suite in classical and popular music

References

External links

Suites by Johann Sebastian Bach
Compositions in E minor